Parakash Electronic is a 2017 Hindi comedy movie directed by Manoj Sharma starring Hemant Pandey, Hrishitaa Bhatt, Sanjay Mishra, Manoj Pahwa Vrajesh Hirjee and Chandrachur Singh.

References

2010s Hindi-language films
Films directed by Manoj Sharma